Hamdorf is a municipality in the district of Rendsburg-Eckernförde, in Schleswig-Holstein, Germany. Hamdorf is situated in Eiderknie in the southern part of the collective municipality of Hohner Harde. The municipal area covers 3,074 hectares.

History
Many prehistoric finds and excavations near the Eider show that Hamdorf has been inhabited since the stone ages. Hamdorf is first mentioned in a deed dated May 28, 1285.

References

Municipalities in Schleswig-Holstein
Rendsburg-Eckernförde